Jarvikina is a genus of prehistoric lobe-finned fish which lived during the Devonian period. Jarvikina named after the Swedish palaeontologist Erik Jarvik.

References 

Prehistoric lobe-finned fish genera
Devonian bony fish
Tristichopterids